The 2013 Team Speedway Junior European Championship was the sixth Team Speedway Junior European Championship season. It was the first time that it was organised by the Fédération Internationale de Motocyclisme and was the second as an under 21 years of age event.

The final took place on 6 July 2013 in Opole, Poland. The defending champions Poland won the final easily with 50 points.

Results

Final
  Opole
 6 July 2013

See also 
 2013 Team Speedway Junior World Championship
 2013 Individual Speedway Junior European Championship

References 

2013
European Team Junior